The 2017 Africa Cup Sevens is a rugby sevens tournament held in Kampala, Uganda on 6–7 October 2017. It will be the 5th championship in a series that began in 2013.

The 2017 tournament serves as a qualifier for the following:
 The 2018 Hong Kong Sevens qualifier tournament, where two teams compete for a chance to be a core team of the 2018–19 World Rugby Sevens Series
 The 2018 Rugby World Cup Sevens, also involving the top two
 The 2018 Commonwealth Games, with the top two Commonwealth of Nations members eligible.

Teams

 
 
 
  
 
 
 
 
 
 

 Notes:

Pool stage
All matches are East Africa Time (UTC+3:00)

Pool A

Pool B

Knockout stage

9th Place

Cup

5th Place

Standings

See also
 2018 Rugby World Cup Sevens qualifying – Men
 Rugby sevens at the 2018 Commonwealth Games
 2017 Women's Africa Cup Sevens

References

2017
2017 rugby sevens competitions
2017 in African rugby union
rugby union
International rugby union competitions hosted by Uganda